Sir Albert Edward Chadwick, CMG, MSM (15 November 1897 – 27 October 1983) was an Australian rules footballer in the (then) Victorian Football League (VFL).

Early life
The son of Andrew Chadwick (1854-1906), and Georgina Ann Chadwick (1867-1948), née Prater, Albert Edward Chadwick was born at Beechworth, Victoria, on 15 November 1897.

He married Thelma Marea Crawley (1899-1979) in 1924. Their son, Robert Edward Chadwick (1927-1992) also played for the Melbourne First XVIII.

Education
He was educated at Tungamah State Primary School (No.2225).

Football
A tough centre half-back who ran hard and straight, he played the majority of his career with Melbourne Football Club, one season with the Prahran Football Club, and one season for Hawthorn Football Club.

Prahran (VFA)
Recruited by Prahran after a chance encounter with the Club's secretary, he made his debut, against North Melbourne, on 24 May 1919, and went on to play in 12 consecutive games for the Prahran First XVIII in 1919.

Melbourne (VFL)
Cleared from Prahran in 1920.

He was runner-up to Edward "Carji" Greeves in the inaugural Brownlow Medal in 1924: with one vote available per home-and-away game, and with Greeves and Chadwick both missing games when playing inter-state football for Victoria, Greeves scored seven votes (i.e., best-on-ground in seven matches) and Chadwick six.

Hawthorn (VFL)
He played for the Hawthorn First XVIII in 17 games (scoring 8 goals) in 1929.

Military service
Having added a year to his age, Chadwick enlisted in the First AIF on 12 February 1916, and went on to serve overseas with the Australian Flying Corps. He was Mentioned in Dispatches in January 1919. He returned to Australia on the HMAT Port Sydney in April 1919, and was awarded the Meritorious Service Medal in 1919.

During World War II, Chadwick served in the Royal Australian Air Force. He was discharged on 6 July 1945 in the rank of Wing Commander, having held the acting rank of Group Captain while serving as the RAAF's Director of Recruiting, a position which he held from 1942.

After Football
Chadwick was Chairman of the Gas and Fuel Corporation of Victoria, the Melbourne Cricket Club president from 1965–1979, and the Melbourne Football Club president from 1950–1962.

Highly successful in business, he was appointed a Companion in the Order of St Michael and St George on 1 January 1967, and knighted on 1 January 1974.

Death
He died at his home in Toorak, Victoria on 27 October 1983 and was cremated at Springvale Botanical Cemetery.

Australian Football Hall of Fame
In 1995, Chadwick was inducted into the Australian Football Hall of Fame.

See also
 1924 Hobart Carnival
 1927 Melbourne Carnival

Footnotes

References 
 First World War Nominal Roll: Sergeant Albert Edward Chadwick (M.S.M.) (281), collection of the Australian War Memorial
 First World War Service Record: Sergeant Albert Edward Chadwick (281), National Archives of Australia
 First World War Embarkation Roll: Second Corporal (Lance Corporal) Commander Albert Edward Chadwick (281), Department of Veterans' Affairs
 World War Two Nominal Roll: Wing Commander Albert Edward Chadwick (250987), Department of Veterans' Affairs
 World War Two Service Record: Wing Commander Albert Edward Chadwick (250987), National Archives of Australia
 Fahey, Charles (2007), "Chadwick, Sir Albert Edward (Bert) (1897–1983)", Australian Dictionary of Biography, Volume 17, Carlton: Melbourne University Press, 2007.
 de Lacy, H.A. (1941), "Unforgettable Characters in Football: Bert Chadwick and the Side he Re-Made, The Sporting Globe, (Saturday, 23 August 1941), p.5.
 Richardson, Nick (2021), Chadwick: A Man of Many Parts, Slattery Media,

External links
 AFL Hall of Fame
 
 
 Bert Chadwick, at Demonwiki
 Albert E.Chadwick, at The VFA Project
 Bert Chadwick, at Boyles Football Photos

1897 births
1983 deaths
Military personnel from Victoria (Australia)
Melbourne Football Club players
Melbourne Football Club coaches
Hawthorn Football Club players
Hawthorn Football Club coaches
Australian Football Hall of Fame inductees
Melbourne Football Club captains
Melbourne Football Club presidents
Prahran Football Club players
Australian rules footballers from Victoria (Australia)
Australian Companions of the Order of St Michael and St George
Australian Knights Bachelor
Australian military personnel of World War I
Royal Australian Air Force personnel of World War II
Royal Australian Air Force officers
Melbourne Football Club Premiership players
Melbourne Football Club Premiership coaches
One-time VFL/AFL Premiership players
One-time VFL/AFL Premiership coaches